David Morrison Reid Henry (14 September 1919 – 1977; sometimes written Reid-Henry)), of British origin, was an illustrator of birds. He signed his pictures DM Henry or D.M.H..
Played cricket for South Woodford cc 1970.
He was the son of entomologist and ornithologist George Morrison Reid Henry and Olive Hobday and had an elder brother, Bruce Charles Reid Henry.

He died in Rhodesia in 1977.

Bibliography

Henry illustrated:
A Falcon in the Field, Jack Mavrogordato
The Popular Handbook of Rarer British birds (editingPAD Hollom) H. F. & G. Witherby (1960)
The Birds of the Atlantic Islands (David Armitage Bannerman and W. Mary Bannerman) (4 vols) 1963-1968 
A New Dictionary of Birds, Sir Arthur Landsborough Thomson (Ed.), 1964
Eagles, Hawks and Falcons of the World Dean Amadon, Leslie Brown, Country Life Books, 1968.

Biography
Highlight the Wild: The Art of the Reid Henrys, Bruce Henry; Palaquin Publishing Ltd., Hartley Wintney, Hampshire; 1986

External links
David Morrison Reid Henry on artnet

Pictures
Sea Eagle
Pheasants (title not stated)

1919 births
1977 deaths
British emigrants to Rhodesia
British bird artists
20th-century British painters
British male painters
20th-century British male artists